Rafael Cruz Llampa (born 18 January 1985), is a Brazilian footballer who plays as a right back for Campeonato Brasileiro Série B club São Bernardo.

Honours
Santo André
Copa do Brasil: 2004

References

1985 births
Living people
Footballers from São Paulo
Brazilian footballers
Association football defenders
Campeonato Brasileiro Série A players
Esporte Clube Santo André players
Democrata Futebol Clube players
Atlético Clube Goianiense players
Clube Atlético Mineiro players
Ceará Sporting Club players
São Bernardo Futebol Clube players
Associação Atlética Aparecidense players